Gordon Titcomb is an American multi-instrumentalist, studio musician and composer, Titcomb tours with Arlo Guthrie playing banjo, mandolin and pedal steel guitar. he has also toured and performed with Hank Williams, Paul Simon, Judy Collins, Willie Nelson and Shawn Colvin.

Titcomb was born in Connecticut and has composed music for Disney, HBO, ESPN and The Maurray Povich Show.
His book  for children The Last Train based on his song of the same name, includes paintings by Wendell Minor and an introduction by Arlo Guthrie.

Discography
The Last Train with Arlo Guthrie, and Mike Auldridge. 2005 Rising Son Records

Bibliography
 The Last Train, Roaring Brook Press, 14 September 2010,

References

External links
 Official website

Musicians from Connecticut
American multi-instrumentalists
Living people
American banjoists
Year of birth missing (living people)